Filippo Strozzi the Elder (4 July 1428 – 14 May 1491) was an Italian banker and statesman, a member of the affluent Strozzi family of Florence.

He was born in Florence to Matteo Strozzi (son of Simone Strozzi and Andreina Rondinelli) and Alessandra Macinghi (daughter of Filippo Macinghi). He was banned by the Medici as a young man, together with all his family, due to the opposition of Palla Strozzi against Cosimo de' Medici. He moved to Naples, and here he gained a renowned status as a banker.

When he returned to Florence he commissioned Benedetto da Maiano for the construction of the famous family palace; however, he died before the completion of the works, in 1534. He also had Maiano, along with Filippino Lippi, build a notable chapel in the Basilica di Santa Maria Novella. Completed in 1502, it houses Strozzi's remains.

Family
He married two times, and produced 12 children.

Fiammetta Adimari
With Fiammetta Adimari (in 1466), daughter of Donato Adimari, who gave him five children:
Alfonso (1467–1534)
Lucrezia (1469–1481)
Alessandro (1471–1473)
Leonora (1472–1473)
Maria

Salvaggia Gianfigliazzi
With Salvaggia Gianfigliazzi, daughter of Bartolommeo Gianfigliazzi (in 1477), who gave him:
Lorenzo (1482–1549), who founded the line of the Princes of Forano
Fiammetta (b. 1476)
Gian Battista (died 1484) 
Alessandra
Caterina
Lucrezia (b. 1487)
Gian Battista, best known as Filippo Strozzi the Younger (1489–1538), husband of Clarice de' Medici

See also
  (category)

References

Italian bankers
Italian politicians
Medieval bankers
1428 births
1491 deaths
Filippo 1
15th-century people of the Republic of Florence
15th-century Italian businesspeople